The 2001 McDonald's All-American Boys Game was an All-star basketball game played on Wednesday, March 28, 2001, at the Cameron Indoor Stadium in Durham, North Carolina. The game's rosters featured the best and most highly recruited high school boys graduating in 2001. The game was the 24th annual version of the McDonald's All-American Game first played in 1978.

2001 game
The game was telecast live by ESPN. The game was fast-paced and ended with one of the highest scores of the history of the event. The East team gained the lead in the first two quarters helped by Dajuan Wagner (who scored a total of 25 points, 11 in the first half), Chris Thomas and Julius Hodge. The first half ended with the East winning on the West by 15 points. Things changed in the second half, when Eddy Curry, Kelvin Torbert and Daniel Ewing led the West to a comeback. Curry had 28 points and earned the MVP award. Other players who starred were Kwame Brown and Tyson Chandler, who, like Curry, after the good performance decided to skip college and declare for the NBA draft; T. J. Ford, who recorded 11 points, 10 rebounds and 7 assists; and David Lee. Of the 24 players, 17 went on to play at least 1 game in the NBA. An unprecedented number of players declared their eligibility for the 2001 NBA Draft: 5 McDonald's All-Americans chose to go straight to professional basketball. Among them, Kwame Brown became the first overall pick to be drafted out of high school. The others were Tyson Chandler (2nd overall), game MVP Eddy Curry (4th overall), DeSagana Diop (8th overall) and Ousmane Cisse (46th overall pick, never played in the NBA).

East roster

West roster

Coaches
The East team was coached by:
 Head Coach Jerry Faulkner of Charlotte Latin School (Charlotte, North Carolina)
 Asst Coach Donay Fullwood of Charlotte Latin School (Charlotte, North Carolina)
 Asst Coach Howard West of Charlotte Latin School (Charlotte, North Carolina)

The West team was coached by:
 Head Coach Robert Hughes of Paul Laurence Dunbar High School (Fort Worth, Texas)
 Asst Coach Leandros Rambo of Paul Laurence Dunbar High School (Fort Worth, Texas)
 Asst Coach Charles Hickman of Paul Laurence Dunbar High School (Fort Worth, Texas)

All-American Week

Contest winners 
 The 2001 Slam Dunk contest was won by David Lee.
 The 2001 3-point shoot-out was won by Maurice Williams.

References

External links
McDonald's All-American on the web
McDonald's All-American all-time rosters 
McDonald's All-American rosters at Basketball-Reference.com
Game stats at Realgm.com

2000–01 in American basketball
2001
2001 in sports in North Carolina
Basketball in North Carolina